Lukas Hofmann (b. Prague, Czech republic 1993) is a curator, a casting director and an interdisciplinary artist whose work revolves around performance, installation art and fashion practice. In 2018, Hofmann won the Jindřich Chalupecký Award.

Hofmann's recent works include Sospiri and Retrospective performances at the National Gallery in Prague, Phantom Limb performance at National Gallery of Denmark, big bag with Barbara Klawitter and Nico Arauner at Moderna Museet, l’eau des algues with Nils Lange at Cabaret Voltaire, for the closing of Manifesta 11, Enzyme at Galerie Frangulyan, classic arrangement of four white roses in collaboration with Dan Bodan at the Schinkel Pavillon, Dry Me a River at a 5000 sqm cleared out Bauhaus hobby market for Plato Ostrava and IKEA Made Fashion, hosted at Galerie AVU.

References

External links 
 

1993 births
Artists from Prague
Living people